This is a chronological list of Australian films by decade and year for the 1990s.  For a complete alphabetical list, see :Category:Australian films.
A list of films produced in Australia by year during the 1990s, in the List of Australian films.

1990 
 List of Australian films of 1990

1991
 List of Australian films of 1991

1992
 List of Australian films of 1992

1993
 List of Australian films of 1993

1994
 List of Australian films of 1994

1995
 List of Australian films of 1995

1996
 List of Australian films of 1996

1997
 List of Australian films of 1997

1998
 List of Australian films of 1998

1999
 List of Australian films of 1999

Notes

External links 
 Australian film at the Internet Movie Database

1990s
Australian